The principle of equal consideration of interests is a moral principle that states that one should both include all affected interests when calculating the rightness of an action and weigh those interests equally. The term "equal consideration of interests" first appeared in Peter Singer's 1979 book Practical Ethics. Singer asserts that if all beings, not just humans, are included as having interests that must be considered, then the principle of equal consideration of interests opposes not only racism and sexism, but also speciesism. Jeremy Bentham argued that a being's capacity to suffer is what is morally relevant when considering their interests, not their capacity for reason.

The principle is related to broader philosophical concepts of impartiality, though impartiality can refer to many other senses of equality, particularly in justice.

See also 

 Argument from marginal cases
 Impartiality

References

Animal ethics
Ethical principles
Utilitarianism